Bang Krathum is a subdistrict (tambon) in the Bang Krathum District of Phitsanulok Province, Thailand.

Etymology
The first element bang (Thai: บาง) means 'village' or 'settlement'.  The second element krathum (Thai: กระทุ่ม) means 'bur-flower tree' (Anthocephalus chinensis).

Geography
Bang Krathum's topography consists of flat, fertile lowlands.  Clockwise from the north, the subdistrict is bordered by Wang Nam Khu (of Mueang Phitsanulok District), Tha Tan, Nakhon Pa Mak, Phai Lom, Ta Fo (of Mueang Phichit District in Phichit Province), Sanam Khli, Khok Salut and Ban Rai. Bang Krathum lies in the Nan Basin, which is part of the Chao Phraya Watershed. The town of Ban Bang Krathum is on the tambon's chief watercourse, a canal which winds through farms heading north-east to Ban Bang Kranoi in Nakhon Pa Mak, where it joins the Wang Thong River. The canal splits once between Ban Bang Krathum and Ban Bang Krathum, where a smaller branch leads due north to Ban Bueng Lam in Nakhon Pa Mak.

Administration
The subdistrict is divided into 11 smaller divisions called (muban), which roughly correspond to the six villages in Bang Krathum.  Bang Krathum is administered by a Tambon administrative organization (TAO). The mubans in Bang Krathum are enumerated as follows:

Temples
Bang Krathum is home to the following three temples:
Wat Bang Krathum Nai in downtown Ban Bang Krathum
Wat Mae Tiap in Ban Mae Tiap
Wat Huai Gaew (Crystal Stream Temple) in Ban Bang Krathum

References

External links
Bang Krathum at Thaitambon.com (Thai)

Tambon of Phitsanulok province
Populated places in Phitsanulok province